Tai'an is a town in Hanjiang District, Yangzhou, Jiangsu, China.

References

Hanjiang District, Yangzhou
Township-level divisions of Jiangsu